The Wankdorfhalle is an indoor sporting arena near the Stadion Wankdorf football stadium in Bern, Switzerland. The capacity of the arena is 3,100 people.  It hosted some matches at the 2006 European Men's Handball Championship and the home games of BSV Bern Muri and Bern Capitals.

Indoor arenas in Switzerland
Buildings and structures in Bern
Handball venues in Switzerland
Sports venues in the Canton of Bern